The phrase Abelard and Heloise generally refers to the famous 12th-century Parisian love affair between Peter Abelard and Héloïse d’Argenteuil.

It may also refer to artistic works based on their story:
 Abelard and Heloise (album), a 1970 album by the Third Ear Band
 Abelard and Heloise, a play by Ronald Millar
 Abelard and Heloise, a book by Constant Mews

See also
"Eloisa to Abelard", a poem by Alexander Pope